Tizaung is a village in the southeast of the Sagaing Division in Burma.  It is located about 2 miles northeast of the township centre of Myinmu by road. The settlement of Paukka also lies by road to the east.

Tizaung contains a notable pagoda.

References

Populated places in Sagaing District